Dijxhoorn may refer to:

Adriaan Dijxhoorn (1889–1953), Dutch soldier and Minister of Defence
Pieter Arnout Dijxhoorn (1810–1839), Dutch painter